Water chestnut may refer to either of two plants (both sometimes used in Chinese cuisine):

 The Chinese water chestnut (Eleocharis dulcis), eaten for its crisp corm
 The water caltrop (Trapa natans), eaten for its starchy seed

See also
 Chinese chestnut
 Chestnut (disambiguation)